The following is a list of awards and nominations received by American filmmaker Martin Scorsese, chronicling his achievements in the film industry. Scorsese is the winner of multiple awards both nationally and internationally, over the course of his prolific career. With nine nominations for the Academy Award for Best Director, he is the most-nominated living director of all time and is second only to William Wyler's 12 nominations overall. He won the award for his film The Departed. Scorsese directed nine films that went on to be nominated for the Academy Award for Best Picture: Taxi Driver (1976), Raging Bull (1980), Goodfellas (1990), Gangs of New York (2002), The Aviator (2004), The Departed (2006), Hugo (2011), The Wolf of Wall Street (2013), and The Irishman (2019).

Scorsese has earned top awards in film (Academy Award), music (Grammy Award), and television (Primetime Emmy Award). He also won the Palme d'Or for Taxi Driver and a Best Director Award for After Hours at the Cannes Film Festival. He received the Silver Lion award for the film Goodfellas at the Venice Film Festival.

Major associations

Academy Awards
The Academy Awards, popularly known as the Oscars, are a set of awards given annually for excellence of cinematic achievements. The awards, organized by the Academy of Motion Picture Arts and Sciences, were first held in 1929 at the Hollywood Roosevelt Hotel.

British Academy Film Awards
The BAFTA Award is an annual award show presented by the British Academy of Film and Television Arts. The awards were founded in 1947 as The British Film Academy, by David Lean, Alexander Korda, Carol Reed, Charles Laughton, Roger Manvell and others.

Directors Guild of America Awards

Golden Globe Awards

Grammy Awards

Primetime Emmy Awards

Other awards

Actors' awarded performances 
Under Scorsese's direction, actors have continually received nominations from the major competitive acting awards (the Academy Award, the BAFTA Award, and the Golden Globe Award).
 76 nominations total: 24 Academy Award, 23 BAFTA Award, 29 Golden Globe Award
 25 Best Leading Actor, 7 Best Leading Actress, 18 Best Supporting Actor, 24 Best Supporting Actress, 2 Best Newcomer

References

Awards
Lists of awards received by film director